Southeast High School is a high school in Oklahoma City, Oklahoma that opened in 1950.  The school closed in 1990, but was reopened and remodeled in 1994 as a magnet school with an emphasis on four new technology programs.  Being a magnet school, students must fill out an application and be admitted to the school, regardless of the school district in which they reside.

When the school reopened in 1994, it was still undergoing renovations.  Shortly after classes started, it became apparent that it would be necessary to choose an alternate site for students until the construction was complete.  The students enrolled at Southeast spent their first semester at the school in makeshift classrooms at the Federal Aviation Administration building in OKC.

Notable alumni
 Gerald McCoy – NFL
 Bobby Murcer – Major League Baseball All-star
 Darrell Porter – Major League Baseball All-star, World Series MVP
 Mickey Tettleton – Major League Baseball All-star
 Rusty Hilger – NFL
 Clendon Thomas – College Football Hall of Fame, NFL
 Don Trull – College Football Hall of Fame, NFL
 Janie Speaks – Olympic gymnast
 Matt Clark – NBA
 Rashawn Thomas - NBA

References

External links
 Southeast's Official Home Page
 Southeast's Official Sports Page

Public high schools in Oklahoma
Schools in Oklahoma City
Magnet schools in Oklahoma